In sport, a debenture is defined as a certificate of agreement of loans which is given under the company's stamp and carries an undertaking that the debenture holder will get a fixed return (fixed on the basis of interest rates) and the principal amount whenever the debenture matures. The terms may also include ancillary benefits such as an option to buy tickets at a favourable price, as well as or instead of interest.  The term stems from the financial concept of a debenture.

A large number of sporting organisations have issued debentures to raise money, to allow their fans to gain a financial stake in the club, to foster a sense of community, and in some cases to fund new construction.

Royal Albert Hall 

An early example of debenture holders having rights to seats at venues was the Royal Albert Hall in London, where about 1,200 of the hall's 5,500 seats were provided on 999-year leases when it opened in 1871 to help finance its construction costs, allowing access to most of its music, sporting and other events, subject to an annual service charge.  The debentures can be passed on or sold, and the tickets to individual events can be resold if the debenture holder does not wish to attend.

Tennis 

The organisers of the Wimbledon Tennis Championships, The All England Club, issue their debenture holders a ticket for each day of the tournament. Furthermore, only debenture holders are permitted to sell their tickets to third parties, either privately or through vendors such as WimbledonDebentureHolders.com.

Rugby 

A rugby debenture is somewhat different as, in the most part, no money in the form of interest is returned to the lender but the rights to obtain tickets for a seat in that ground. The exact terms of the debentures vary from issue to issue but will be covered in the main here. Charlton Athletic also used this financial method to aid their move back to The Valley.

Welsh Rugby Union 

These debentures carry no interest on the amount invested and the advantage of holding said debenture is the right to obtain tickets at the Millennium Stadium, the home of the Welsh Rugby Union where Wales play in the Six Nations Championship.

The serial numbers on the debentures denominate the expiry date (although some are renewable and / or renewed earlier), starting with:

The WRU has changed some of the numbers during the term of the debenture.

Rugby Football Union 

These are issued by the RFU and permit the holder to 10 years rights to the ticket issue; they are transferable and the principal sum invested is returned 75 years from date of issue.

An RFU debenture confers on the debenture holder the right to purchase, at face value, one ticket for Rugby Union events at Twickenham Stadium for a given period, currently 10 years (with the exception of a small number of business debentures in the South Stand which confer ticket rights for 15 years). A debenture is fully repayable, currently after 75 years, but bears no interest.

The following is the current debenture issue:

Other sports organisations 

Other sports organisations which issue debentures in a similar fashion include:

 Arsenal Football Club
 Donington Park
 Hampden Park
 Millennium Stadium
 Murrayfield Stadium
 Nottinghamshire County Cricket Club
 Twickenham Stadium
 Wembley Stadium

Not all sporting debentures provide an entitlement to free tickets. Some organisations, such as the Millennium Stadium, merely give holders the right to purchase a ticket for events.

See also 

 Personal seat license, an analogous concept amongst US sports franchises

References 

Cricket terminology
Rugby union terminology
Sports terminology
Sports venues
Credit
Loans
Tennis terminology